The 2013 Food City 500 was a NASCAR Sprint Cup Series stock car race held on March 17, 2013, at Bristol Motor Speedway in Bristol, Tennessee. Contested over 500 laps on the 0.533 mile (0.858 km) concrete oval, it was the fourth race of the 2013 Sprint Cup Series championship. Kasey Kahne of Hendrick Motorsports won the race, while Kyle Busch finished second. Brad Keselowski, Kurt Busch, and Clint Bowyer rounded out the top five.

Report

Background

The track's turns are banked from twenty-four to thirty degrees, while the front stretch, the location of the finish line, is banked from six to ten degrees. The back stretch also has banking from six to ten degrees. The track has a seating capacity of 160,000 people.

Before the race, Jimmie Johnson was leading the Drivers' Championship with 129 points,  while Brad Keselowski stood in second with 124 points. Dale Earnhardt Jr. followed in the third position, seventeen points ahead of Denny Hamlin and Carl Edwards in fourth and fifth. Mark Martin, with 95, was two points ahead of Matt Kenseth and Greg Biffle, as Clint Bowyer was one point ahead of  Aric Almirola in tenth, and two points ahead of Ricky Stenhouse Jr. Paul Menard completed the first twelve positions with 82 points. The defending winner of the race was Keselowski, who won the race in 2012.

Practice and qualifying

Three practice sessions were held before the race. The first session, held on March 15, 2013, was 90 minutes long. The second and third were held on March 16, and were both 60 minutes long. During the first practice session, Keselowski was quickest with a time of 14.869, ahead of Kenseth and Kyle Busch in second and third. Bowyer followed in the fourth position, ahead of Hamlin in fifth.

In the Saturday morning session, Busch was quickest, ahead of Kenseth and Hamlin in second and third. Jeff Burton and Kahne followed in the fourth and fifth positions. Kevin Harvick, Jeff Gordon, Jamie McMurray, Kurt Busch, and Johnson rounded out the first ten positions. In the final practice session for the race, Busch remained quickest with a time of 15.372 seconds. Kahne followed in second, ahead of David Gilliland and Kenseth in third and fourth. Hamlin, who was third quickest in second practice, only managed fifth.

During qualifying, forty-four cars were entered, but only forty-three were able to start because of NASCAR's qualifying procedure. Busch clinched his eleventh career pole position, with a record-setting time of 14.813 seconds. After his qualifying run, Busch commented, “The car felt great during that lap. We’ve never really worried too much about qualifying runs. We unloaded with a really good race car and we just kept fine-tuning to make it a little bit better – and we were able to get it where it was pretty quick in practice.” He was joined on the front row of the grid by Kahne. Hamlin qualified third, Brian Vickers took fourth, and Paul Menard started fifth, after being scored fifteenth in the final practice session. McMurray, Keselowski, Tony Stewart, Martin Truex Jr., and Joey Logano completed the first ten positions on the grid. The driver that failed to qualify was Scott Riggs.

Results

Qualifying

Race results

Standings after the race

Drivers' Championship standings

Manufacturers' Championship standings

Note: Only the first twelve positions are included for the driver standings.

References

Food City 500
Food City 500
Food City 500
NASCAR races at Bristol Motor Speedway